Newport Beach is a coastal city in southern Orange County, California, United States. Newport Beach is known for swimming and sandy beaches. Newport Harbor once supported maritime industries; however today it is used mostly for recreation. Balboa Island draws visitors with a waterfront path and easy access from the ferry to the shops and restaurants.

History

The Upper Bay of Newport is a canyon carved by a stream in the Pleistocene period. The Lower Bay of Newport was formed much later by sand brought along by ocean currents, which constructed the offshore beach now recognized as the Balboa Peninsula of Newport Beach.

For thousands of years, the Tongva people lived on the land in an extensive, thriving community. The Tongva villages of Genga and Moyongna were located in Newport Beach. Throughout the 1800s, Europeans colonized the land and forcibly removed and assimilated the Tongva. Present-day Newport Beach exists upon the unceded homelands of the Tongva people, and they have a historical and continued presence as the traditional caretakers of the land. 

The State of California sold acre-plots of land for $1 a piece in the Newport area. Anglo-American inhabitation in the area grew substantially following 1870 when a 105-ton steamer named The Vaquero, captained by Captain Samuel S. Dunnells (against warnings posted by surveyors), safely steered through the lower and upper bay of Newport where it unloaded its cargo. James Irvine upon hearing the astonishing news, quickly traveled from his home in San Francisco to the San Joaquin Ranch. Meeting in Irvine's ranch house near current day UC Irvine with his brother, Robert Irvine, and friend James McFadden, they agreed that the newly found port should be simply named "Newport" which is where Newport Beach gets its name. James McFadden built a long McFadden Wharf in 1888.

In 1905, city development increased when Pacific Electric Railway established a southern terminus in Newport connecting the beach with downtown Los Angeles. In 1906 (with a population of 206 citizens), the scattered settlements were incorporated as the City of Newport Beach.

Settlements were filled in on the Peninsula, West Newport, Newport Island, Balboa Island, and Lido Isle. In 1923, Corona del Mar was annexed and in 2002, Newport Coast, East Santa Ana Heights, and San Joaquin Hills were annexed. In 2008, after a long battle with the city of Costa Mesa, Newport Beach annexed West Santa Ana Heights.

Geography 

The city is bordered on the west by Huntington Beach at the Santa Ana River; on the north by Costa Mesa, John Wayne Airport, the City of Irvine and UC Irvine; and on the east by Crystal Cove State Park.

Areas of Newport Beach include Corona del Mar, Balboa Island, Balboa Peninsula (also known as Balboa), Lido Peninsula, Newport Coast, San Joaquin Hills, Santa Ana Heights, and West Newport.

Newport Harbor and Newport Bay
Newport Harbor is a semi-artificial harbor that was formed by dredging Newport Bay estuary during the early 1900s. Several artificial islands were built, which are now covered with private homes: Newport Island, Balboa Island, Little Balboa Island, Collins Island, Bay Island, Harbor Island, Lido Isle, and Linda Isle.

Newport Harbor once supported maritime industries such as boatbuilding, shipbuilding, and commercial fishing, but today it is used mostly for recreation. Its shores are occupied mostly by private homes and private docks. Newport Harbor has approximately 9,000 boats and is one of the largest recreational boat harbors on the U.S. west coast. It's a popular destination for all boating activities, including sailing, fishing, rowing, canoeing, kayaking, and paddleboarding.

Commercial maritime operations today include the Catalina Flyer ferry to Catalina Island, harbor tours, sport fishing, whale watching day trips, and charters as well as a few small commercial fishing boats.

Newport Bay is divided by the Pacific Coast Highway bridge, which is too low for most sailboats and very large boats to pass under. North of the bridge is referred to as Upper Newport Bay, or the Back Bay. South of the bridge is commonly called Lower Newport Bay, or Newport Harbor. However the Back Bay also has harbor facilities, especially the marina and launch ramp at Newport Dunes Marina.

The north end of the Newport Harbor channels surrounding Lido Isle has several small business centers and was at one time used as a home by the fishing fleets. On the North East side of the channel, the Lido Marina Village now acts as the local port to many "Newport Party Boats" that can be rented for events, as well as small merchants and local restaurants. It also hosts the area boat show each year, and an organic "Farmers Market" on Sundays, in addition to being the port for the local Gondola Company. In 2014, the center was closed for a renovation. The Lido Village was reopened in 2017 after a complete renovation.

In 1927, a home was built at the mouth of the entrance of Newport Harbor that came to be known as the China House of China Cove. The home was built using traditional Chinese architecture. It was a landmark in the Newport Beach Harbor until it was demolished in the 1980s. Some of the original roof can be seen on a home located in the China Cove.

Upper Newport Bay is an estuary that was formed by a prehistoric flow of the Santa Ana River. Today it is fed by a small stream from San Diego Creek. Much of Upper Newport Bay is a protected natural area known as the Upper Newport Bay Ecological Reserve, established in 1975.

Climate
Newport Beach has a mid-latitude semi-arid climate (Köppen climate classification BSk) with characteristics of a warm-summer Mediterranean climate (Köppen: Csb). Like many Los Angeles and Orange coastal cities, Newport Beach exhibits weak temperature variation, diurnally and seasonally, compared to inland cities even a few miles from the ocean. The Pacific Ocean greatly moderates Newport Beach's climate by warming winter temperatures and cooling summer temperatures. Diurnal temperature variation is stronger during the winter than during the summer. Newport Beach does not receive enough precipitation to qualify as a true Mediterranean climate.

Demographics

2010

The 2010 United States Census reported that Newport Beach had a population of 85,186. The racial makeup of Newport Beach was 74,357 (87.3%) White (82.3% Non-Hispanic White), 616 (0.7%) African American, 223 (0.3%) Native American, 5,982 (7.0%) Asian, 114 (0.1%) Pacific Islander, 1,401 (1.6%) from other races, and 2,493 (2.9%) from two or more races. Hispanic or Latino of any race were 6,174 persons (7.2%).

The Census reported that 84,784 people (99.5% of the population) lived in households, 151 (0.2%) lived in non-institutionalized group quarters, and 251 (0.3%) were institutionalized.

There were 38,751 households, out of which 8,212 (21.2%) had children under the age of 18 living in them, 17,273 (44.6%) were opposite-sex married couples living together, 2,608 (6.7%) had a female householder with no husband present, 1,199 (3.1%) had a male householder with no wife present. There were 1,846 (4.8%) unmarried opposite-sex partnerships, and 233 (0.6%) same-sex married couples or partnerships. 12,838 households (33.1%) were individuals, and 4,412 (11.4%) had someone living alone who was 65 years or older. The average household size was 2.19. There were 21,080 families (54.4% of all households); the average family size was 2.81.

The population was different ages with 14,744 people (17.3%) under the age of 18, 6,659 people (7.8%) aged 18 to 24, 22,299 people (26.2%) aged 25 to 44, 25,322 people (29.7%) aged 45 to 64, and 16,162 people (19.0%) who were 65 years of age or older. The median age was 44.0 years. For every 100 females, there were 97.1 males. For every 100 females aged 18 and over, there were 95.5 males.

The homeowner vacancy rate was 1.7%; the rental vacancy rate was 7.8%. 50,511 people (59.3% of the population) lived in owner-occupied housing units, and 34,273 people (40.2%) lived in rental housing units.

In 2009–2013, Newport Beach had a median household income of $106,333, with 7.9% of the population living below the federal poverty line.

2000

As of the census of 2000, there were 70,032 people, 33,071 households, and 16,965 families residing in the city. The population density was 4,738.8 inhabitants per square mile (1,829.5/km). The racial makeup of the city was 92.22% White, 0.53% African American, 0.26% Native American, 4.00% Asian, 0.12% Pacific Islander, 1.13% from other races, and 1.74% from two or more races. Hispanic or Latino of any race were 4.71% of the population. There were 33,071 households, out of which 18.0% had children under the age of 18 living with them, 42.5% were married couples living together, 6.1% had a female householder with no husband present, and 48.7% were non-families. 35.3% of all households were made up of individuals, and 10.1% had someone living alone who was 65 years of age or older. The average household size was 2.09, and the average family size was 2.71. In the city, the population was spread out, with 15.7% under the age of 18, 6.5% from 18 to 24, 33.0% from 25 to 44, 27.2% from 45 to 64, and 17.6% who were 65 years of age or older. The median age was 42 years. For every 100 females there were 97.9 males. For every 100 females aged 18 and over, there were 96.6 males. According to a 2019 US Census estimate, the median income for a household in the city was $64,423, while the median family income was $126,976. Males had a median income of $73,425 versus $45,409 for females. The per capita income for the city was $63,015. About 2.1% of families and 4.4% of the population were below the poverty line, including 3.0% of those under age 18 and 3.5% of those age 65 or over.

Economy

Housing prices in Newport Beach ranked eighth highest in the United States in a 2009 survey.

Newport Beach is home to one Fortune 500 company, insurer Pacific Life. Other companies based in Newport Beach include Acacia Research, Galardi Group (Wienerschnitzel), Chipotle Mexican Grill, The Original Hamburger Stand, Tastee-Freez, the Irvine Company, Jazz Semiconductor, PIMCO, and Urban Decay. Fletcher Jones Motor Cars in Newport Beach is the largest Mercedes-Benz dealership in the world. At one time Edwards Theatres had its headquarters in Newport Beach. Before its dissolution Air California was headquartered in Newport Beach. The city's largest law firm is Stradling Yocca Carlson & Rauth, with approximately 75 attorneys at its Fashion Island location. Toyota has a design center, Calty Design Research which is in Newport Beach and responsible for the exterior design of the 2nd, 5th, and 7th generation Celica, as well as some Lexus and Scion models.

Top employers
According to the city's 2021 Comprehensive Annual Financial Report here are the top employers in the city.

Arts and culture

Points of interest

 Newport Center and Fashion Island
 Hoag Hospital
 Newport Back Bay or Upper Newport Bay
 Newport Pier
 Balboa Pier
 Balboa Fun Zone
 Balboa Island Ferry
 Balboa Island
 Lido Isle
 Lido Marina Village
 Inspiration Point
 Crystal Cove Shake Shack
 Sherman Library and Gardens
 Newport Sports Museum
 Pacific Coast Highway
 Orange County Council BSA Sea Base
 The Crab Cooker
 Corona del Mar State Beach
 Crystal Cove State Park
 The Wedge (surfing)
 Lovell Beach House
 Wooden Boat Festival

Past landmarks

 The China House of China Cove
 Orange County Museum of Art
 The Reuben E. Lee
 Rendezvous Ballroom
 The Banana Stand
 Balboa Inn
 Hall House

Attractions

Beaches and surfing
Beachgoers have flocked to Newport Beach since the Pacific Electric Railway began bringing them in 1905. Attractions include the city beaches from the Santa Ana River to the tip of the Balboa Peninsula, Corona del Mar State Beach, and the beaches at Crystal Cove State Park. Newport Beach is known for good surfing, especially between Newport Pier and the Santa Ana River. At the tip of the Balboa Peninsula, The Wedge offers world-class bodyboarding and bodysurfing. Newport Pier and Balboa Pier draw fishermen and sightseers. A boardwalk runs  from 36th Street in West Newport, past Newport Pier and Balboa Pier, to between E and F Streets on the Balboa Peninsula for both pedestrians and bikers.

Harbor and boating
Newport Harbor is the largest recreational boat harbor on the U.S. west coast, and a popular destination for all boating activities, including sailing, fishing, rowing, kayaking, and paddleboarding.

The annual Christmas Boat Parade started in 1908.

Competitive sailing, rowing, and paddling events are common. The annual Newport to Ensenada International Yacht Race is the largest sailboat race in the world.

Boating activities are organized by five private yacht clubs, along with Orange Coast College, UC Irvine, and the Sea Scouts, all of which have sailing, rowing, and water activity bases on the harbor. The Newport Aquatic Center allows public participation in competitive rowing, canoeing, kayaking, and outrigger canoe racing. The Orange Coast College School of Sailing and Seamanship offers recreational and professional sailing and mariners' courses and certifications, including United States Coast Guard licensing. Weekly races take place during the summer including the Beer Can Races.

Nautical clubs
 Newport Harbor Yacht Club 
 Balboa Yacht Club 
 Bahia Corinthian Yacht Club 
 Lido Isle Yacht Club

Balboa
The historic Balboa Pavilion and Balboa Island Ferry are on the Balboa Peninsula and Balboa's most famous landmarks. The 500-passenger Catalina Flyer is adjacent to the Pavilion and provides daily transportation to and from Avalon, located on Santa Catalina Island. The Balboa Fun Zone is also home to the Newport Harbor Nautical Museum.

Balboa Island village draws many visitors. A waterfront path around the island attracts walkers and joggers and provides easy access from the ferry to the shops and restaurants.

Media
 Newport Beach Independent (newspaper)
 Newport Beach (magazine)

Culture and nightlife

Fashion Island at Newport Center is a regional shopping and entertainment destination. Also at Newport Center, the Orange County Museum of Art exhibits modern and contemporary art, with emphasis on the work of Californian artists.

Dining in Newport Beach tends to focus on seafood restaurants.

Parks and recreation

Upper Newport Bay, or the Back Bay, is ringed by Back Bay Drive and a network of trails and paths that attract bicyclists, rollerbladers, joggers, and walkers. Bird watchers and nature lovers are drawn to the Upper Newport Bay Ecological Reserve and Peter and Mary Muth Interpretive Center; and Crystal Cove State Park features tide pools at its beach, with backcountry hiking and mountain biking trails. Camping is available at Crystal Cove State Park and at the Newport Dunes Waterfront Resort and Marina. Whale watching is also popular in the area, with both scheduled and charter boats leaving directly from Newport Harbor. Whales and dolphins can often be seen from the Balboa and Newport Piers, as well as the shoreline during migration season.

Fishing is also extremely popular in Newport Bay, off the coast of Newport, and along the Newport Bay Jetty. Within the bay, there are multiple locations to purchase bait for dockside or spearfishing convenience. There are about 80 fishable species located in Newport Bay. A few of the most commonly fished species include the Gray Smoothhound Shark, Leopard Shark, Round Stingray, Shovelnose Guitarfish, Pacific Staghorn Sculpin, Silvery Mullet, Top-smelt, California Halibut, Spotted Sand Bass, Yellowfin Croaker, Bat Ray, Thornback Ray, Diamond Turbot, Shiner Surfperch, Corbina, Opaleye, Pile Surfperch, and Red Shiner. Commercial fishing is also prominent in offshore Newport Beach and Newport Bay. Lobsters are commonly fished in the reefs. However, the bright orange Garibaldi fish found offshore is a protected species.

On dark nights intense occurrences of bioluminescence can be observed when waves splash into the shore or when marine animals leave glowing traces in their wake.

Golf
The Pelican Hill area has two golf courses that rank among Golf Digest America's 100 Greatest Public Golf Courses.

Government

Municipal

The City of Newport Beach was incorporated on September 1, 1906 and adopted its charter on January 7, 1955. The city implements a council–manager form of government, directed by a seven-member council who reside in specific geographic districts, but are elected at-large. Council elections take place in even-numbered years, and council members serve four-year terms. The mayor is chosen annually by the city council.

Until 1927 the city's governing body was known as a board of trustees with a president as its head. An act of the Legislature in 1927 changed the board to City Council with a mayor as the head.

State and federal representation

Voting history
Newport Beach has supported Republican candidates for president and governor consistently since at least 1962.

As of February 2020, the California Secretary of State reported that Newport Beach had 57,408 registered voters; of those, 14,097 (24.56% vs. 35.63% in Orange County) are registered Democrats, 27,472 (47.85% vs. 34.16% in Orange County) are registered Republicans, 12,996 (22.64% vs. 25.29% in Orange County) have stated no political party preference, and 2,843 (4.95% vs. 4.92% in Orange County) are registered with a third party. According to a March 2018 report by the Sacramento Bee, Newport Beach has the second highest percentage of conservative voters among large cities in California.

The Republican candidate exceeded 70% of the vote in Newport Beach in all seven presidential elections from 1964 to 1988 and seven of the nine gubernatorial elections from 1962 to 1994.

Although the politics of California have trended in favor of the Democratic Party, Newport Beach has remained Republican but has become less Republican over time. In 2016, as Donald Trump became the first GOP presidential candidate to lose Orange County since Alf Landon in 1936, Trump won Newport Beach by a margin of 14 points. Trump also won Newport Beach by a margin of nearly ten points in his 2020 re-election bid.

Education

 Newport Elementary School
 Corona del Mar High School
 Newport Harbor High School
 Sage Hill School
 Pacifica Christian High School
 Carden Hall
 Eastbluff Elementary School
 Ensign Intermediate School
 Harbor Day School
 Harbor View Elementary School
 Lincoln Elementary School
 Mariners Elementary School
 Newport Heights Elementary School
 Newport Coast Elementary School
 Our Lady Queen of Angels School
 Roy O. Andersen Elementary School

Infrastructure

Fire department
The Newport Beach Fire Department is the agency that provides fire protection, lifeguard coverage, and emergency medical services.

Newport Beach has 8 fire stations spread across the city, as well as a Lifeguard Headquarters at the base of the Newport Pier.

Marine operations 

In 2013 alone the marine division performed 3,811 water rescues. Newport Beach lifeguards are recognized as the top agency in the nation, considering their relatively small size. They are also recognized as an advanced agency by the United States Lifesaving Association.

Newport Beach lifeguards also hold an annual summer Junior Lifeguard program which is one of the nation's largest and oldest. The Junior Lifeguard program works closely with the John Wayne Cancer Foundation to spread skin cancer awareness.

Included in their area is The Wedge, a spot located at the extreme east end of the Balboa Peninsula that is known for its large wedge-shaped waves, which make it a popular spot for skimboarding, surfing, bodyboarding, and bodysurfing. Newport Beach has one of the most diverse coastlines in the world, spanning over 6 miles. For this reason the NBFD Marine Operations Division requires its ocean lifeguards to be in top shape and to have years of local ocean experience.

Notable people

In popular culture

The city has figured into several television shows and movies:
 The music video for Childish Gambino's "3005" was filmed on the Ferris Wheel at the Balboa Fun Zone.
 The TV show The O.C. was based on the fictional lives of people living in Newport Beach.
 MTV replaced its hit teen-reality series Laguna Beach: The Real Orange County with a new show, Newport Harbor: The Real Orange County, on August 15, 2007. Only the cast and location changed in the new series which was based on the lives of high school students living in Newport Beach.
 The TV series Arrested Development is set in Orange County and often features scenes at Newport Beach.
 Several scenes from the Disney Channel movie The Thirteenth Year were filmed at the Balboa Pavilion in 1999.
 The pop rock band Cute Is What We Aim For has a song titled "Newport Living".
 The TV series The Real Housewives of Orange County featured scenes of Newport Harbor.
 A guest on You Bet Your Life in 1954 was the mayor of Newport Beach noting that Balboa was a congregating point for southern Californian young people over Easter break, with 35,000 visiting the town of 18,000.
 The exterior of the Newport Beach Central Library appeared as the reunion venue in the 1997 film Romy and Michele's High School Reunion.
 The Devil Inside video by the Australian band INXS was filmed around the Balboa Fun Zone.
 The 1917 film Cleopatra by J. Gordon Edwards was filmed in Newport Beach.
 The clothing brand Hollister Co. has featured many brands including clothing that says Newport Beach.
 The movie All Quiet on the Western Front (1930) was filmed at Fashion Island in Newport Beach before its construction.
 The movie The Boatniks (1970) was filmed in Newport Harbor.
The TV series Speechless is set in Newport Beach, Orange County.
 The Reckless Moment, a 1949 film noir starring James Mason and Joan Bennett, filmed and set in Newport.

Sister cities

  Antibes, France
  Ensenada, Mexico
  Okazaki, Japan

See also
 Communities of Newport Beach, California
 List of cities and towns in California

References

External links

 

Archival collections
 Guide to the Collection on the Development of Newport Beach, California. Special Collections and Archives, The UC Irvine Libraries, Irvine, California.
 Guide to the Lars Labagnino Collection on Newport Beach Real Estate. Special Collections and Archives, The UC Irvine Libraries, Irvine, California.
 Guide to the Hugh R. McMillan Photographs. Special Collections and Archives, The UC Irvine Libraries, Irvine, California.

 
1906 establishments in California
Cities in Orange County, California
Incorporated cities and towns in California
Populated coastal places in California
Populated places established in 1906
Populated places on the Santa Ana River
Surfing locations in California
Places with bioluminescence